In February 2023, protests broke out in the Solomon Islands.

Background 
The country previously was hit by mass unrest and deadly riots in November 2021.

On 2 February 2023, the United States reopened its embassy in the country after a 30-year absence. On 7 February 2023, Premier of Malaita Province Daniel Suidani was removed from office after a vote of no confidence from the provincial legislature. As a result, protests were held in Auki.

References 

2023 protests
February 2023 events in the Solomon Islands
Conflicts in 2023
China–Solomon Islands relations
Protests in the Solomon Islands